Colleen Young is an American swimmer.  She won a bronze medal at the 2016 Paralympic Games.  She also won bronze medals in the 100 backstroke and 100 breaststroke at the 2015 World Championships She competes in the Paralympic class S13.  In 2016 she set a Pan-American record in the 100m breast.

Career
In 2020 she won the silver medal in the 200m individual medley at the 2020 Paralympic Games. On April 14, 2022, Young was named to the roster to represent the United States at the 2022 World Para Swimming Championships.

References

Living people
Swimmers at the 2016 Summer Paralympics
Swimmers at the 2020 Summer Paralympics
Medalists at the 2016 Summer Paralympics
Medalists at the 2020 Summer Paralympics
Medalists at the World Para Swimming Championships
Year of birth missing (living people)
Paralympic medalists in swimming
Paralympic silver medalists for the United States
Paralympic bronze medalists for the United States
Paralympic swimmers of the United States
Sportspeople from St. Louis
Fairfield Stags swimming and diving
College women's swimmers in the United States
American female medley swimmers
American female breaststroke swimmers
S13-classified Paralympic swimmers
21st-century American women